C-66 is a county-designated highway in the US state of Michigan running about  across the northern tip of the Lower Peninsula. The roadway starts in the unincorporated community of Cross Village in Emmet County at an intersection with M-119 and C-77. It follows Levering Road through rural areas to an interchange with Interstate 75 (I-75) west of Cheboygan. The eastern terminus is at an intersection with US Highway 23 (US 23) and M-27 in downtown Cheboygan. The first roadways along what is now C-66 were in place by the early 20th century. Segments were paved by 1936, although some reverted to a gravel surface during World War II. The full roadway was paved by the mid-1950s, and the C-66 moniker was designated on the roadway in the early 1970s.

Route description
The roadway starts at a junction with M-119 (Lake Shore Drive) and C-77 (State Road) in the community of Cross Village near Lake Michigan in Emmet County. C-66 travels southward for about  concurrently along C-77 to the intersection with Levering Road. From there, C-66 turns eastward on Levering Road, leaving town. The landscape outside of town is mostly woodland with scattered fields. Except for a jog near Hill Road in Bliss Township, Levering Road is a straight road running due east. C-66 intersects C-81 (Pleasantview Road) in a clearing before entering the community of Levering. The county road passes through some residential areas and by a baseball field before meeting US 31. C-66 turns south to run concurrently along US 31 for about a quarter mile (0.4 km) before turning eastward again.

Levering Road continues easterly leaving town south of Sherett Lake. East of the intersection with Ingleside Road, C-66 crosses into Cheboygan County. The roadway curves to the northeast before returning to a due eastward course north of Munro Lake along the Hebron–Munro township line.. The landscape changes to include more farm fields once road passes the lake. C-66 intersects I-75 at exit 326 along the latter. On the east side of the interchange, Levering Road passes Sea Shell City, a tourist trap, and turns northeastward into Hebron Township. C-66 then turns easterly again before it crosses into Beaugrand Township, taking the additional name Cheboygan Road. The roadway crosses branches of the Little Black River and passes to the south of the Cheboygan County Airport. East of the airport, C-66 enters the city of Cheboygan and follows State Street into town; this area is residential in nature. State Street crosses the North Central State Trail, a rail trail, before turning to the southeast. The roadway passes into the northern end of downtown near several smaller businesses.. C-66 terminates at a four-way intersection with Main Street one block west of the Cheboygan River; this intersection also marks the northern terminus of M-27. As a county-designated highway, C-66 is maintained by the Emmet and Cheboygan county road commissions (ECRC, CCRC) in their respective counties.

History
Roadways along the route of Levering Road in Cheboygan County existed as far back as 1902 in Hebron and Munro townships; the section south of the township line was not yet built at the time.  By 1927, Levering Road extended across the tip of the Lower Peninsula; near the Hebron–Beaugrand township line in Cheboygan County, the county road made a jog to follow what is now Wollangur and Hill roads. In 1930, the ECRC paved Levering Road between US 31 and the county line and the CCRC paved the roadway in Beaugrand Township. By mid 1936, it was paved from a point between Cross Village and the Pleasantview Road intersection to the county line in Emmet County as well as the Beaugrand Township section in Cheboygan County. During World War II, the counties reverted most of Levering Road to a gravel surface; pavement in Emmet County started east of Pleasantview Road instead of west, and Cheboygan County had no sections paved. At the same time, the new roadway was opened to bypass Wollangur and Hill roads.

In late 1949 or early 1950, the ECRC repaved Levering Road westward back to the point between Cross Village and Pleasantview Road that had been paved before the war. In late 1951 or early 1952, the CCRC paved its section of Levering Road. In late 1954 or early 1955, the ECRC completed paving all of Levering Road in its jurisdiction. The county-designated highway system was created around after October 5, 1970. The C-66 designation was first shown on the 1971 state map following the routing used today.

Major intersections

See also

References

External links

 C-66 at Michigan Highways

C-66
Transportation in Emmet County, Michigan
Transportation in Cheboygan County, Michigan